Evans is an unincorporated community in Vernon Parish, Louisiana, United States. Its zipcode is 70639.

Notes

Unincorporated communities in Vernon Parish, Louisiana
Unincorporated communities in Louisiana